2002–03 Pirveli Liga was the 14th season of the Georgian Pirveli Liga. The season began on 4 September 2002 and ended on 31 May 2003.

Format
There were 16 teams in the league taking part in a two-round competition. The top two teams gained automatic promotion to Umaglesi Liga, the third-placed club entered in play-off contest against the top-tier side and the bottom three teams were relegated.

League standings

See also
2002–03 Umaglesi Liga
2002–03 Georgian Cup

References

External links
Soccerway 

Erovnuli Liga 2 seasons
2002–03 in Georgian football
Georgia